The Epic Victory was the second experimental jet designed by Epic Aircraft, a company that was based in Bend, Oregon. Epic Aircraft declared bankruptcy in 2009.

Development
The Victory is a single-engine very light jet that was intended to be powered by a single Pratt & Whitney Canada PW600. Epic used the Williams FJ33 engine for testing but planned to switch to the PW600 for final production.

The aircraft seats 4 to 5, including the pilots, in a 2+2 or a 2+1+2 configuration. The aircraft took Epic six and a half months to design from concept to a flying prototype, with the first flight on 6 July 2007 from Roberts Field in Redmond, Oregon.

The company had intended that the jet would be available for less than US$1 million. The aircraft was displayed at the Experimental Aircraft Association's AirVenture fly-in in 2007 at Oshkosh, Wisconsin, where the company began accepting down payments.

The prototype's Federal Aviation Administration registration expired on 31 May 2017. It has not been renewed and the aircraft has been deregistered.

Specifications

See also

References

External links

Company Home Page
Aircraft Page
Flyer.co.uk Article "Epic Victory Jet makes first flight"

Victory
2000s United States business aircraft
Very light jets
Single-engined jet aircraft
T-tail aircraft
Low-wing aircraft
Aircraft first flown in 2007